The Three Caballeros is a 1944 American live-action/animated musical anthology film produced by Walt Disney and released by RKO Radio Pictures. The film premiered in Mexico City on December 21, 1944. It was released in the United States on February 3, 1945 and in the United Kingdom in March 1945. It was the 7th Walt Disney animated feature film, and it marks the 10th anniversary of Donald Duck and plots an adventure through parts of Latin America, combining live-action and animation. This is the second of the six package films released by Walt Disney Productions in the 1940s, following Saludos Amigos (1942). It is also notable for being one of the first feature-length films to incorporate traditional animation with live-action actors.

The film is plotted as a series of self-contained segments, strung together by the device of Donald Duck opening birthday gifts from his Latin American friends. Several Latin American stars of the period appear, including singers Aurora Miranda (sister of Carmen Miranda) and Dora Luz, as well as singer and dancer Carmen Molina.

The film was produced as part of the studio's goodwill message for Latin America. The film stars Donald Duck, who in the course of the film is joined by old friend José Carioca, the cigar-smoking parrot from Saludos Amigos, who represents Brazil, and later becomes friends with a pistol-packing rooster named Panchito Pistoles, who represents Mexico.

Plot 
The film, celebrating Donald Duck's 10th anniversary, consists of seven segments, each connected by a common theme. In the film, it is Donald Duck's birthday (namely Friday the 13th), and he receives three presents from friends in Latin America. The first present is a film projector, which shows him a documentary about birds called . The first segment of the documentary tells the story of Pablo, a penguin seeking the warm weather of Equatorial South America. The next segment details some of the odd birds of Latin America. During this part documentary, he learns about the Aracuan Bird, who received his name because of his eccentric song. The documentary then shifts to the perspective of a man narrating a story from his childhood, where he discovers and befriends a donkey with the wings of a condor in Uruguay.

The next present is a book given to Donald by José. This book tells of Bahia (spelled "Baía" in the film), which is one of Brazil's 26 states. José shrinks them both down so that they can enter the book. Donald and José meet up with several of the locals, who dance a lively samba, and Donald ends up pining for one girl Yaya, the cookie seller, but fails and gets jealous of another man. After the journey, Donald and José leave the book.

Upon returning, Donald realizes that he is too small to open his third present. José shows Donald how to use "black magic" to return himself to the proper size. After opening the present, he meets Panchito, a native of Mexico. The trio take the name "The Three Caballeros" and have a short celebration. Panchito tells Donald of the tradition behind the piñata. José and Panchito then blindfold Donald, and have him attempt to break open the piñata, eventually revealing many surprises. The celebration draws to a close when Donald is fired away by firecrackers in the shape of a ferocious toy bull (with which the firecrackers are lit by José with his cigar).

Throughout the film, the Aracuan Bird appears at random moments. He usually taunts everyone with his madcap antics, sometimes stealing José's cigar and trying to make José jealous. His most famous gag is when he re-routes a train that Donald and José are riding on by drawing new tracks, causing the train to disassemble.

The film consists of seven segments:

"The Cold-Blooded Penguin" 
This segment is narrated by Sterling Holloway, reproducing images of the penguins of in Antarctica. In the segment, a penguin named Pablo is so fed up with the freezing conditions of the South Pole that he decides to leave his home for warmer climates, navigating the long coast of Chile (including the Juan Fernández Islands and Viña del Mar), passing by Lima (the capital of Peru) and Quito (the capital of Ecuador) before landing on the Galápagos Islands.

"The Flying Gauchito" 
This segment, with adult narration provided by Fred Shields, involves the adventures of a little boy from Uruguay and a winged donkey, who goes by the name of Burrito (which is Spanish for "little donkey").

"Baía" 

This segment involves a pop-up book trip through the Brazilian state of Bahia (spelled Baía in the film), as Donald and José meet up with some of the locals who dance a samba and Donald pining for one of the women, a cookie seller named Yaya-(portrayed by singer Aurora Miranda), who later gives Donald a kiss after he gives her a bouquet of flowers.

"Las Posadas" 
This is the story of a group of Mexican children who celebrated Christmas by re-enacting the journey of Mary, the mother of Jesus and Saint Joseph searching for room at the inn.  meant "inn", or "shelter", and their parents told them "no " at each house until they came to one where they were offered shelter in a stable.

"Mexico: Pátzcuaro, Veracruz and Acapulco" 
Panchito gives Donald and José a tour of Mexico City and the country of Mexico on a flying sarape, or magic carpet. Several Mexican dances and songs are learned here. A key point to what happens later is that Donald is pining for some more ladies again, tries to hound down every single one he sees, and gain return affections, but once more he fails every time and ends up kissing José while blindfolded.

"You Belong to My Heart" and "Donald's Surreal Reverie" 
The skies of Mexico City result in Donald falling in love with singer Dora Luz. The lyrics in the song itself play parts in the scenarios as to what is happening as well. Then several imagined kisses lead to Donald going into the "Love is a drug" scene. Donald constantly envisions sugar rush colors, flowers, and Panchito and José popping in at the worst moments, making chaos. The scene changes after Donald manages to dance with Carmen Molina from the state of Oaxaca, from the Isthmus of Tehuantepec. The two dance and sing the song . Carmen begins by singing the song, with Donald "quacking" out the rest of the chorus with her. This scene is notable for providing the masterful combination of live-action and cartoon animation, as well as animation among the cacti.

The scene is interrupted when Panchito and José suddenly spice things up for the finale of the movie, and Donald ends up battling the same toy bull with wheels on its legs the day before from earlier. The catch is that it is now loaded with fireworks and other explosives, following with a fireworks finale with the words "The End" exploding from the fireworks, first in Spanish, in the colors of the flag of Mexico, then the second in Portuguese, in the colors of the flag of Brazil, and finally in English, in the colors of the flag of the United States (The End).

Voice cast 

 Clarence Nash as Donald Duck
 José do Patrocínio Oliveira as José Carioca
 Joaquin Garay as Panchito Pistoles
 Pinto Colvig as the Aracuan Bird
 Aurora Miranda as Yaya
 Dora Luz
 Carmen Molina
 Sterling Holloway as the Narrator (Pablo the Cold-Blooded Penguin)
 Frank Graham as the Narrator
 Fred Shields as the Narrator (The Flying Gauchito) (Spanish with a Mexican accent)
 Francisco "Frank" Mayorga as the Mexican Guitarist
 Nestor Amaral as José Carioca singing voice Baia
 Trío Calaveras
 Trío Ascencio del Río
 Padua Hills Player
 Carlos Ramírez – Mexico

Soundtrack 
The film's original score was composed by Edward H. Plumb, Paul J. Smith, and Charles Wolcott.

After seeing Manuel Esperón's success in the Mexican movie industry, Walt Disney called him personally to ask him to participate in the movie. New English lyrics were written to the song by Ray Gilbert.
"Baía" based its melody on the Brazilian song  which was written by Ary Barroso and first released in 1938. New English lyrics were written by Ray Gilbert. Another Ary Barroso song, was featured in the earlier film Saludos Amigos with its original Portuguese lyrics.
 "Have You Been to Bahia?" was written by Dorival Caymmi and was originally released in 1941. The song was translated into English with no major changes, other than replacing the word  (a woman of African descent) with "Donald", who the song is addressed to in the film. Parts of the song are still sung in its original Portuguese.
"Pandeiro & Flute" was written by Benedito Lacerda, and is played during the Baia train sequence. It is the opinion of Disney's Chief Archivist Emeritus, Dave Smith, that the piece was not written originally for the film, but was instead licensed to Disney; however, he is unaware of any evidence that proves this opinion. The piece was developed by Charles Wolcott, and Lacerda went uncredited in the film.
  was written by Ary Barroso and first released in 1941. Unlike Barroso's other song to be featured in this film,  was left in its original Portuguese. The song is sung by Aurora Miranda in the film.
 "Mexico" was composed by Charles Wolcott with lyrics by Ray Gilbert and was sung by Carlos Ramírez. It is the only song in the film to be completely original.
 The  was written by Jonás Yeverino Cárdenas in 1900. It is considered one of the most famous compositions from the Mexican state of Coahuila.
 "Lilongo" was written by Felipe "El Charro" Gil and copyrighted in the U.S. in 1946, though it was first recorded in the U.S. in 1938. It is performed by Trío Calaveras in the film.
 "You Belong to My Heart" based its melody on the Mexican song , which was written by Agustín Lara.
  (also spelled ) is a traditional Mexican song and the unofficial anthem of the Isthmus of Tehuantepec, in the Mexican state of Oaxaca. The melody is believed to have originated from Andalusia and was rearranged by Andres Gutierrez. Lyrics were written to it by Máximo Ramó Ortiz in 1853. It was arranged for this film by Charles Wolcott.
Over time this piece has also come to be known under the names "J.C. Polka", "Jesse Polka", and "Cactus Polka".
 The instrumental composition  ("Over the Waves") written by Mexican songwriter Juventino Rosas and first published in 1888 can be heard in the film's score during "The Cold-Blooded Penguin" segment while Pablo the penguin is sailing to the Galápagos Islands. A small portion of "Jingle Bells" is briefly sung by Donald Duck.
"Babalu" by Desi Arnaz is used briefly.

Release

Theatrical

The film premiered in Mexico City on December 21, 1944. It was released in the United States on February 3, 1945, and in the United Kingdom in March of that year.

The Three Caballeros was re-released to theaters on April 15, 1977. For this re-issue, the film was edited significantly and re-released in featurette form at 41 minutes, to accompany a re-issue of Never a Dull Moment.

Television
For the film's television premiere, The Three Caballeros aired as the ninth episode of the first season of ABC's Disneyland television series. Edited, shortened, and re-titled A Present for Donald for this December 22, 1954, broadcast and subsequent re-runs, Donald receives gifts from his friends for Christmas, instead of for his birthday as in the original.

Home media

 November 19, 1982 (VHS and Betamax)
 October 6, 1987 and October 4, 1988 (VHS, Betamax and Laserdisc)
 October 28, 1994 (VHS and Laserdisc – Walt Disney Masterpiece Collection)
 1995 (Laserdisc – Exclusive Archive Collection)
 May 2, 2000 (VHS and DVD – Walt Disney Gold Classic Collection)
 April 29, 2008 (DVD – Classic Caballeros Collection)
 January 30, 2018 (Blu-ray – 75th Anniversary Edition 2-Movie Collection)

Reception

Critical reception
The Three Caballeros received mixed reviews upon its original release. Most critics were relatively perplexed by the "technological razzle-dazzle" of the film, thinking that, in contrast to the previous feature films up to this time, "it displayed more flash than substance, more technique than artistry." Bosley Crowther for one wrote in The New York Times, "Dizzy Disney and his playmates have let their technical talents run wild." Other reviewers were taken aback by the sexual dynamics of the film, particularly the idea of Donald Duck lusting towards flesh-and-blood women. As Wolcott Gibbs put it in a negative review of the film for The New Yorker, such a concept "is one of those things that might disconcert less squeamish authorities than the Hays office. It might even be said that a sequence involving the duck, the young lady, and a long alley of animated cactus plants would probably be considered suggestive in a less innocent medium."

The film holds an 83% approval rating on Rotten Tomatoes based on 18 reviews, with an average score of 6.50/10. The site's consensus reads, "One of Disney's more abstract creations, The Three Caballeros is a dazzling, colorful picture that shows the company at an artistic acme."

Box office
The film returned rentals to RKO by 1951 of $3,355,000 with $1,595,000 being generated in the U.S. and Canada. The film generated in excess of $700,000 in Mexico.

Accolades

Other media
 The Aracuan Bird later made an appearance in the 1947 short film Clown of the Jungle, where it constantly interrupts Donald's attempts to photograph birds in a South American jungle.
 Agustín Lara's song "You Belong to My Heart" was featured in a Disney short called Pluto's Blue Note (1947). It was later recorded by Bing Crosby. Ary Barroso's song "Bahia" and the title song became popular hit tunes in the 1940s. The complete "Bahia" sequence was cut from the 1977 theatrical reissue of the film.
 One of the scenes of the former Mickey Mouse Revue features Donald, Jose and Panchito in the show, performing the movie's theme song. They also appear in some of Disney's themed resorts, such as Disney's Coronado Springs Resort where one can find topiaries of the trio, and Disney's All-Star Music Resort where a fountain depicting the trio is the centrepiece of the Guitar-shaped Calypso Pool.
 Some clips from this film were used in the "Welcome to Rio" portion of the Mickey Mouse Disco music video.
 Fictional music group Alvin and the Chipmunks covered the title song, "The Three Caballeros", for their 1995 Disney-themed album When You Wish Upon a Chipmunk; however, The Walt Disney Company neither sponsored nor endorsed the album the song was featured on.
 Don Rosa wrote and drew two comic book sequels: The Three Caballeros Ride Again (2000) and The Magnificent Seven (Minus 4) Caballeros (2005).
 In February 2001, José and Panchito performed with Donald in the House of Mouse episode "The Three Caballeros", voiced by Carlos Alazraqui (Pistoles) and Rob Paulsen (Carioca), appearing as recurring characters after that. In 2015, also makes an appearance in Mickey Mouse episode  as performers at Mickey's birthday. The pair later appeared in the Mickey and the Roadster Racers episode "Mickey's Perfecto Day", in which they are former bandmates of Donald's who perform a concert with Daisy Duck after Donald is unable to take part.
 In September 2006, Panchito and José returned to Walt Disney World where they appeared for meet and greets. They were only found outside the Mexico pavilion in World Showcase at Epcot. Donald also appeared with them.
 In April 2007, the film became the basis for a ride at the Mexican pavilion at Walt Disney World's Epcot named Gran Fiesta Tour Starring The Three Caballeros.
 The 2011 Mickey's Soundsational Parade at Disneyland features all three Caballeros and the Aracuan Bird in one parade unit.
 Along with many other Disney characters, Panchito, José, and Donald appear in the updated It's a Small World ride at Disneyland during the section portraying Mexico.
 On June 9, 2018, a new show called Legend of the Three Caballeros was produced by Disney Interactive focusing on crazy adventures and was first released on the DisneyLife app in the Philippines. It produced 13 episodes.
 José and Panchito make appearances in the 2017 DuckTales reboot, with Bernardo De Paula as José and Arturo Del Puerto as Panchito.

See also
 Walt & El Grupo, a 2008 documentary film about the making of The Three Caballeros
 1944 in film
 List of American films of 1944
 List of Walt Disney Pictures films
 List of Disney theatrical animated features
 List of animated feature films of the 1940s
 List of highest-grossing animated films
 List of films with live action and animation
 List of package films

References

External links

 
 
 
 
 
 

1944 animated films
1944 films
1940s American animated films
1940s musical fantasy films
1940s English-language films
American animated comedy films
American animated fantasy films
American anthology films
American Christmas films
American films with live action and animation
Animated anthology films
Animated musical films
American musical fantasy films
Animated films about friendship
Animated films about penguins
Bullfighting films
Cockfighting in film
Donald Duck films
Fictional trios
Films about birthdays
Animated films about chickens
Films adapted into television shows
Films directed by Bill Roberts
Films directed by Clyde Geronimi
Films directed by Harold Young (director)
Films directed by Jack Kinney
Films directed by Norman Ferguson
Films produced by Walt Disney
Films scored by Paul Smith (film and television composer)
Films set in Antarctica
Films set in Brazil
Films set on the Galápagos Islands
Films set in Mexico
Films set in Uruguay
Walt Disney Animation Studios films
Walt Disney Pictures animated films